The Moskauer Deutsche Zeitung, or MDZ for short, is a biweekly newspaper published in Moscow and partially online. It consists of 24 pages, two thirds (16 pages) of which are in German and one third (8 pages) in Russian. The print edition has a circulation of approx. 25,000 copies. It is distributed in hotels, cafés, restaurants, business centres and airports in Moscow.

History
In 1870 Theodor Ries founded the Moskauer Deutsche Zeitung, shortly afterwards he left the newspaper to Christian Woldemar. Until the beginning of the First World War it served as a source of information for the Germans in Moscow. Due to the war it had to cease its publication and could not be revived during the time of the Soviet Union.

Since 2000 the newspaper publishes a selection of its articles on a website. The website was relaunched in 2012. The MDZ also issues special editions on a regular basis.

References

External links 
 

Companies based in Moscow
Newspapers published in Russia
German-language newspapers
Mass media in Moscow
Newspapers published in the Russian Empire
Publications established in 1870
Germany–Russia relations